Castor River may refer to:

Castor River (Ontario), Canada
Rivière au Castor, Quebec, Canada
Castor River (Missouri), United States

See also
Castor Creek (disambiguation)

fr:Castor (rivière)